Misty Lown is an American dance teacher, studio owner and author of One Small Yes. She is the founder of Misty's Dance Unlimited and the More Than Just Great Dancing dance studio affiliate program.

Companies 
Lown founded Misty's Dance Unlimited in 1998 in Onalaska, Wisconsin, teaching ballet, tap, jazz, hip hop, and beginner's classes. The studio integrates classes on community building and service into the dance curriculum. Lown is also the owner of More Than Just Great Dancing, an international affiliation program that establishes standards for dance programs and management. The program included 25 dance studios as of 2013. That year Lown and Misty's Dance Unlimited won Evoloshen's "Most Amazing Companies" award. She has been recognized as “Teacher of the Year” by Eclipse, "Outstanding Businesswoman of the Year" by the YWCA and awarded the “Pope John XXIII Award for Distinguished Service” by Viterbo University and the “Philanthropy Award” from the Red Cross.

Lown married her high school boyfriend and has five children.

References

American female dancers
American dancers
Living people
Dance teachers
People from Onalaska, Wisconsin
Year of birth missing (living people)
21st-century American women
1998 establishments in Wisconsin